The 2010 Asian Games featured 53 competition venues and 17 training venues on the sixteen days Games competition from November 12 to November 27, 2010. Of them, eleven competition venues and one training venues are newly built, while the rest are renovated. All of the competition venues will be used after the opening ceremony bar football venues, which will be held from November 7, 2010. For opening and closing ceremonies, they will be held outside the stadium, along the Pearl River in Haixinsha Island.

Competition venues

New

Existing

Outside Guangzhou

References

External links

Official website 

 
2010
2010 Asian Games